Dorcadion sareptanum is a species of beetle in the family Cerambycidae. It was described by Kraatz in 1873. It is known from Kazakhstan and Russia.

Subspecies
 Dorcadion sareptanum euxinum Suvorov, 1915
 Dorcadion sareptanum kubanicum Plavilstshikov, 1934
 Dorcadion sareptanum sareptanum Kraatz, 1873
 Dorcadion sareptanum striatiforme Suvorov, 1913

References

sareptanum
Beetles described in 1873